Belisli is a village in the Davachi Rayon of Azerbaijan.

References 

Populated places in Shabran District